Etlingera inundata is a monocotyledonous plant species described by S. Sakai and Hidetoshi Nagamasu. Etlingera inundata is part of the genus Etlingera and the family Zingiberaceae. No subspecies are listed in the Catalog of Life.

References 

inundata